A toposcope, topograph, or orientation table is a kind of graphic display erected at viewing points on hills, mountains or other high places which indicates the direction, and usually the distance, to notable landscape features which can be seen from that point.  They are often placed in public parks, country parks, the grounds of stately homes, at popular vantage points (especially accompanying or built into triangulation stations) or places of historical note, such as battlefields.

Toposcopes usually show the points of the compass, or at least North.

Smaller toposcopes usually consist of a circular plaque, or a plaque with a circle marked on it, mounted horizontally on a plinth. They will have radiating lines indicating the direction to various landmarks, together with the distance and often a pictorial representation of the landmark. They are frequently constructed of a metal such as bronze, cast or etched, set on top of a concrete or stone block, which provides weather- and vandal-resistance.

Large toposcopes may be circular paved areas, with numerous plaques around the perimeter, each indicating a particular feature of the landscape.

References

External links 
Photos of various toposcopes in the UK on geograph.org.uk

Cartography